Issue networks are an alliance of various interest groups and individuals who unite in order to promote a common cause or agenda in a way that influences government policy. Issue networks can be either domestic or international in scope depending on their collective goal. With the rise of the internet, many interest groups have turned to online resources, such as blogs and social media, to promote and spread their cause because of its low cost and high efficiency in outreach. An issue network's tactics vary depending on their goals and purpose. In developed countries, issue networks often push for a change in policy within the government bureaucracy. An example includes the wide-ranging network of environmental groups and individuals who push for more environmental regulation in government policy. Other issue networks may revolve around such controversial issues as abortion, gun ownership rights, and drug laws. In the most extreme circumstances, issue networks may seek to achieve their means through violence, such as terrorist organizations looking to overthrow existing governments altogether. In the U.S, the most common tactic of effective issue networks is the role they play in what is called Iron Triangles. This is the three-way back-and-forth communication process between Congress, Bureaucracies, and the interest groups that make up an issue network where they discuss policy and agendas in order to compromise on solutions to satisfy each other's agendas.

Types of issue networks 
In this table, subjects are categorized from high to low complexity and salience. Salience, meaning how high something affects a large number of people, and complexity meaning how much training and knowledge is needed for someone to answer the questions that can be asked about the subject. The typography below is by William T. Gormley

Iron triangles 
Iron triangles are three-pronged relationships that are used between interest groups. Generally these interest groups are composed of businesses, congressional committees, and Federal agencies set to deal with a certain issue. These iron triangles do not have the general welfare of the public in mind, but are for the furthering of favorable policies for the interest group. For example, an iron triangle dealing with fossil fuels would be composed of a business or corporation dealing in fossil fuels, a congressional committee who oversees fossil fuel laws and regulations, and a fossil fuel Federal Agency which makes sure these laws are obeyed. However, iron triangles do not benefit the public, they only benefit the players within the iron triangle. Some cases these iron triangles not only benefit inside the ring, but often do so at the expense of the constituencies that Congress and these Federal bureaucracies are supposed to represent.

Iron triangles versus issue networks 
Issue networks are not the same as iron triangles for several reasons. One of the main differences between iron triangles and issue networks is that issue networks are generally free-forming groups of people in the public sector who form a coalition together, not through a congressional committee, or a Federal Agency but are bound together to accomplish a task at hand. These groups, most often, once the goal has been accomplished either A, break up and only form if the issue is brought back up, or B, find another issue similar in scope which they want to tackle. Another difference between iron triangles and Issue networks is that sometimes they can be at antagonistic with one another. Referring back to the paragraph above, if we take an iron triangle issue network who wants to build a pipeline, an issue network can form as a group of citizens who oppose it. They may oppose it for various reasons, but what brings them together temporarily is to not allow it to be built. If the issue network is successful in blocking the fossil fuel pipeline, then the issue network may dissolve because the task has been accomplished. Another example is the case in regards to environmental issue networks that disagree with the lax environmental standards pursued by private energy companies. It is also important to note often different Issue networks can also compete with one another, as in the case of advocates versus opponents of abortion rights.

Interest groups
Interest groups are organizations that may be formed by constituents of an issue network to help promote their cause. They usually focus on tactics of raising money to donate to political campaigns and lobbying politicians already elected into office. Forming these organizations are often the most effective way for an issue network to influence government policy. Without them, it can be hard for the members of issue networks to unite as a whole in order to effectively make their demands heard. Interest groups play an integral part of Iron Triangle networks. They act as the voice of the people in the constant communication between themselves, legislatures, and bureaucracies.

Other countries
From a stable policy community, through a period of substantial change under firm government control, to a densely populated and competitive environment composed of issue networks. In countries such as Australia and the United Kingdom, government is returning to a more interactive strategy regarding issue networks. In other countries, group input is a vital component of the policy-making process, through that process bureaucratic expertise is built-up and maintained. The existence of knowledgeable government agencies is necessary to balance the demands of competing groups and thereby ensure greater stability of policy outcomes. For example, in Australia, higher education is a good example of how the government is listening to clientele groups (issue networks) less than they were in the past due to the complexity of universities and the higher education system.

See also 
  Iron triangle (US politics)#Cultivation of a constituency
 Global public policy networks
 Policy network analysis
 Policy network (in German)
 Multistakeholder governance model

Sources

Notes
 Marc Landy and Sidney M. Milkis.  American Government: Balancing Democracy and Rights.  New York: McGraw-Hill, 2004.
 Milton C. Cummings, Jr. and David Wise. Democracy Under Pressure: An Introduction to the American Political System, Tenth Edition. Thompson- Wadsworth, 2005
 Christine Barbour and Gerald C Wright. the Republic, Power and Citizenship in American Politics., Indiana University, 2009.

Advocacy groups
Political terminology
Public policy